Plaka Pilipino was a Filipino record label of Vicor Music Corporation from 1970 to 1981. It released works by famous local artists such as Pilita Corrales, Fred Panopio, Victor Wood, Yoyoy Villame, and Didith Reyes. It focused on folk and native music.

Notable artists
Pilita Corrales
Nora Aunor
Vilma Santos
Jesus Garcia, Jr.
Bobby Gonzales
Romeo Miranda
Sylvia La Torre
Edgar Mortiz
Ric Manrique Jr.
Yoyoy Villame
Fred Panopio
Sonny Loremas
Max Surban
Victor Wood
Eddie Peregrina
Didith Reyes
Romeo Quiñones
Bert Marcelo
Richie D'Horsie
Bentot

References

External links
 

Philippine record labels
Vicor Music